John Anderson (December 28, 1870–August 7, 1954) was a member of the Wisconsin State Senate.

Biography
Anderson was born on December 28, 1870, in Carver County, Minnesota. He attended Gustavus Adolphus College.

Career
Anderson was elected to the Senate in 1930 on the Wisconsin Progressive Party ticket. He was re-elected the following term. Additionally, he was a member of the school board and Mayor of Barron, Wisconsin. He was a Republican.

Anderson later moved to Los Angeles, California, where he became involved in real estate. He died in his home there.

References

People from Carver County, Minnesota
People from Barron, Wisconsin
Wisconsin state senators
Wisconsin Progressives (1924)
20th-century American politicians
Mayors of places in Wisconsin
School board members in Wisconsin
Gustavus Adolphus College alumni
1870 births
1954 deaths